Pressbaum is a town in the district of St. Pölten-Land in the Austrian state of Lower Austria.

In 1881, Johannes Brahms completed his Second Piano Concerto while in the town.

It belonged to Wien-Umgebung District which was dissolved at the end of 2016.

Population

References

Cities and towns in St. Pölten-Land District